Nacionalna Televizija Happy (often shortened to Happy) is a privately owned TV channel in Serbia. Happy has gained a strong reputation for its entertainment programming. The station offers a compilation of international and domestic movies, American sitcoms, dramas, Indian soap operas and Latin telenovelas, as well as locally produced talk/variety shows, sitcoms and reality shows.

Happy's parent company is the Belgrade-based Invej, which also owns many business entities that often serve as sponsors of the program, which is owned by Predrag Ranković.

History
Happy was previously called Košava, the latter once owned by Marija Milošević, daughter of Slobodan Milošević, Serbia's authoritarian president in power during the 1990s. Marija Milošević sold her ownership in Kosava TV to lawyer Borivoj Pajović, who was at the time President of the board of directors in the daily newspaper Blic.

After a couple of ownership changes, in 2006 the Regulatory Authority for Electronic Media issued Košava with a license with national coverage, which was shared with kids channel Happy – while Happy aired exclusively kids programming in the morning, Košava broadcast informative and current affairs programs in the evening. At that time, REM's (then RRA) decision was disputed since neither TV stations had the capacity for national broadcasting, unlike, for example, RTL which competed for a license but was not issued one.

In 2007, Predrag Ranković, known to the public for involvement in shady business deals, bought part of Kosava, although his name was never mentioned in formal ownership documents. In 2010, Košava bought Happy, and Košava changed its name to Happy and started to broadcast as one program. Former kids channel Happy changed name to Happy Kids, but channel closed in 2017.

Happy started getting a high viewership because of its TV series and movies airing, most because of Turkish drama series and Latin American telenovelas. Since its beginning, Happy has made several reality TV shows, with Parovi as most popular of them. It got Happy huge success and big viewership, but also a particular criticism.

Programming
Happy TV has been shown many foreign TV series and movies, mostly Turkish, American, Latin American, etc.

Happy TV has shown many international and domestic movies, which have been shown with great result with big viewership not only in Serbia but also in the Serbian diaspora where Happy TV is present. It has aired latest box-office hits in United States.

Since start, Happy TV has made several reality shows in co-operation with Emotion Production, and as result of it they broadcast a local version of internationally well known Wife Swap, called Menjam ženu, which had been broadcast earlier on RTV Pink. They also made a Serbian version of Wheel of Fortune called Kolo sreće, and later show called Soba sreće.

Telenovelas, drama series and soap operas
Happy TV has broadcast many foreign telenovelas, drama series and soap operas, mainly from Latin America, Turkey and India.

bold – currently airing
 – finished
 – cancelled

Serbian telenovelas
Tajna nečiste krvi 
Sudbine 
Lepi i mrtvi 
Jelena 
Crni Gruja

American dramas
Life Unexpected 
Beverly Hills, 90210 
The Good Wife

Brazilian telenovelas
O Clone (Zabranjena ljubav) 
Cordel Encantado (Zavet ljubavi) 
A Vida da Gente (Život teče dalje)

Croatian telenovelas
Bitange i princeze

Italian dramas
RIS Delitti Imperfetti

Turkish drama series
Iffet (Ifet) 
Unutulmaz (Zaboravi ako možeš) 
Körduğüm (Kazna)
Elveda Derken (Suze Bosfora) 
Sonbahar (Jesenje suze) 
Beni Affet (Oprosti mi) 
Hayat Şarkısı (Suze moje sestre) 
Küçük Kadınlar (Sestre) 
Valley of the Wolves (Dolina vukova) 
Gönülçelen (Jesenje suze)

Latin American telenovelas
Águila Roja (Crveni orao) 
Clase 406 (Izgubljene godine)

Indian soap operas
Madhubala – Ek Ishq Ek Junoon (Madhubala)

Romanian telenovelas
Daria, iubirea mea (Jedina ljubav)

References

External links

Television stations in Serbia
Radio stations established in 1994
Television channels and stations established in 1998
1994 establishments in Serbia